National Bank of Pakistan Football Club or commonly known as National Bank or NBP is a Pakistani football club based in Karachi, Sindh. The club competes in Pakistan Premier League, the top-tier of Pakistani football, since earning promotion in 2004–05 season.

The club has won Football Federation League twice, first in 1993 and second in 2004–05, and National Football Challenge Cup twice, winning their first in 1993 and second in 2013.

First team

Current squad

Honours
Pakistan National Football Challenge Cup: 2
 1993, 2013

Football Federation League: 2
 1993, 2004

References

External links
NBP website

Football clubs in Pakistan
Financial services association football clubs in Pakistan
Football in Karachi